Jews in Los Angeles comprise approximately 17.5 percent of the city's population, and 7% of the county's population, making the Jewish community the largest in the world outside of New York City and Israel. , over 700,000 Jews live in the County of Los Angeles, and 1.232 million Jews live in California overall. Jews have immigrated to Los Angeles since it was part of the Mexican state of Alta California, but most notably beginning at the end of the 19th century to the present day. The Jewish population rose from about 2,500 in 1900 to at least 700,000 in 2015. The large Jewish population has led to a significant impact on the culture of Los Angeles. The Jewish population of Los Angeles has seen a sharp increase in the past several decades, owing to internal migration of Jews from the East Coast, as well as immigration from Israel, France, the former Soviet Union, the UK, South Africa, and Latin America, and also due to the high birth rate of the Hasidic and Orthodox communities who comprise about 10% of the community's population.

Population
As of 2020, the Jewish population of Los Angeles is estimated at 530,000. Although the last Jewish population survey of the Los Angeles Jewish community was conducted in 1997, a systematic study of the Jewish population in the United States conducted by the Steinhardt Social Research Institute's American Jewish Population Project estimates that Los Angeles County has the second largest Jewish population in the U.S., second only to New York City. It has the fifth largest Jewish population of any city in the world.

Persian Jews

As of 2008, the Los Angeles area had the largest Persian Jewish population in the U.S., at 50,000.

The Iranian American Jewish Federation (IAJF) of Los Angeles is a prominent non-profit organization that has been serving the Iranian Jewish community of Greater Los Angeles for the last forty-one years. IAJF is a leading organization in their efforts to fight local and global Antisemitism, protect Iranian Jews domestically and abroad, promote a unified community, participating in social and public affairs, provide financial and psychosocial assistance to those in need through philanthropic activities, and more.

The Beverly Hills Unified School District, the established Jewish community, and security attracted Persian Jews to Beverly Hills, and a commercial area of the city became known as "Tehrangeles" due to Persian ownership of businesses in the Golden Triangle. After the 1979 Iranian Revolution, about 30,000 Iranian Jews settled in Beverly Hills and the surrounding area. The Iranian Jews who lost funds in Iran were able to quickly adapt due to their high level of education, overseas funds, and experience in the business sector. In 1988, 1,300 Iranian Jews settled in Los Angeles.

In 1990 John L. Mitchell of the Los Angeles Times wrote that these Iranian Jews "function as part of a larger Iranian community" but that they also "in many respects[...]form a community of their own" as they "still manage to live their lives nearly surrounded by the culture of their homeland--going to Iranian nightclubs, worshiping at Iranian synagogues, shopping for clothing and jewelry at Iranian businesses." There had been initial tensions with Ashkenazi Jews in the synagogues due to cultural misunderstandings and differences in worship patterns, partly because some Iranian Jews did not understand that they needed to assist in fundraising efforts and pay dues. The tensions subsided by 2009.

Israelis

Los Angeles is home to the largest population in the Israeli diaspora, with more than 250,000 Israeli Americans living in Los Angeles, according to the Israeli American Council. The Israeli community of Los Angeles is clustered in the San Fernando Valley and Westside of Los Angeles. The communities of Encino and Tarzana in particular are noted for their large Israeli populations. Many Israeli Americans in Los Angeles are first, second, or third-generation Americans and are the descendants of early Israeli immigrants arriving in the 1950s, while others are more recent immigrants who began moving to Los Angeles in a wave of migration that began in the 1970s continued to this day. The Israeli American community of Los Angeles has risen to prominence in local business, government and culture. Los Angeles is home to the world's first Israeli Community Center (ICC), similar to a JCC, located in the San Fernando Valley.

Russian Jews

Los Angeles is home to approximately 25,000 Russian-speaking Jews, and has the second-largest population of Russian Jews from the former Soviet Union in the United States, after New York.

Latin Jews

As of 2006, there were approximately 11,000 Latin Jews living in Los Angeles especially in the West Hills area.

Moroccan Jews
The Moroccan Jewish community in Los Angeles is one of the largest in North America, approximately 10,000 Moroccan Jews reside in the Los Angeles area, mostly in Pico-Robertson, North Hollywood, and Beverly Hills. Many are the descendants of community members who first emigrated to the United States in the aftermath of World War II. Many others came later in the 20th century from Israel, and beginning in the early 21st century from France due to increasing antisemitism there. Most are adherents to Orthodox Judaism, with some belonging to the Haredi, Reform, and Conservative Judaism as well. The community has their own synagogues as well as a community center.

Rhodeslis

The Los Angeles area has been estimated to home to 900 Rhodeslis as of 2005. The first members of the Rhodes Jewish community settled in the neighborhood of Ladera Heights beginning in the early 20th century. The Rhodeslis came to Los Angeles fleeing antisemitism and for opportunity. Ladera Heights was the heart of the Rhodesli community for decades. Rhodeslis spoke Ladino at home and established their own synagogue, the Sephardic Hebrew Center; which later merged with Sephardic Temple Tifereth Israel in 1993. Beginning in the 1960s and 70s, the Rhodeslis began to leave Ladera Heights due to redlining, and moved to other neighborhoods in the city. Today the Rhodeslis are scattered across LA County and some of them fear assimilation into the broader Los Angeles Jewish community and the loss of their unique culture and traditions. Ladino is still spoken by some members of the community, especially those who are older or are particularly interested in their ethnic history.

Beginning in the middle of the 20th century, the Rhodesli community of Los Angeles started a unique custom which continues to this day, annual trips to Catalina. Every summer a number of Rhodeslis (40 as of 2005), board the ferry to Catalina Island to embark on a group trip where they can connect with their shared culture and history. An influential member of the community, Aron Hasson once stated to the Jewish Journal, "It was natural to them to take a boat across the water to an island nearby." They visit Catalina Island because its location resembles that of Rhodes in relationship to Turkey. 
 
The Mediterranean island of Rhodes was once the center of an important Sephardic Jewish community with its own unique culture and customs. The Jews of Rhodes, who called themselves Rhodeslis, lived peacefully under the Ottoman rule, preserving the medieval form of the Ladino language they took with them following the Inquisition and their expulsion from Spain in 1492. Rhodes was invaded by the Nazis in 1944, and Rhodes Jews were among the many sent off in cattle cars to their deaths in concentration camps. Many of the Rhodeslis who survived the Holocaust and fled World War II and its aftermath immigrated to Los Angeles, because there was an existing Rhodesli community in South Los Angeles, and the area's Mediterranean climate and coastline reminded them of their former home.

Yemenite Jews

Beginning with the wave of Israeli immigration to Los Angeles which began in the mid-20th century and continues to the present-day, a number of Yemenite Jews from Israel came to Los Angeles and mainly established themselves in the areas of Pico-Robertson, Santa Monica, and Encino; where several restaurants offering Yemenite Jewish cuisine exist. There are a number of synagogues in the Yemenite tradition, most notably Tifereth Teman on Pico. Many Yemenites also attend synagogues catering to the general Mizrahi Jewish community of the city.

In 1964, several dozen members of the Yemenite community began to meet pray in the Yemenite dialect of Hebrew in their homes, community rooms, and even a bank basement. For the High Holidays they would rent a room in local synagogues. For the next 18 years the Yemenites did not have their own synagogue. In the fall of 1986, they purchased a three-bedroom home in a residential area on Hayworth Avenue which they then converted to use as the first Yemenite synagogue in Los Angeles, Tifereth Teman. The move was met with opposition by some of the neighbors, some of whom were Jewish, many of whom were not Jewish and were White; which led to accusations of antisemitism by some members of the synagogue. The synagogue also attracted supporters, mostly within the local Orthodox Jewish community. Some older Orthodox residents of the neighborhood began to attend services at Tifereth Teman out of convenience as it was the closest synagogue to their homes. Opponents of the synagogue filed complaints with the city zoning board as the building was zoned residential. The synagogue was said to have the support of local councilman Zev Yaroslavsky, who later declared himself to be neutral in the face of community opposition. In 1987, Tifereth Teman lost their zoning battle and was ordered to close. This decision was later appealed by the clergy.
 Tifereth Teman later moved to another building with the proper zoning, where it remains today.

South African Jews

As of 1986, more than 500 South-African Jews reside in Irvine, in Orange County outside of Los Angeles. Most South-African Jews in Los Angeles are Orthodox and go to shul or a Chabad center.

History
The history of the Jews in Los Angeles includes significant contributions in the arts and culture, science, education, architecture and politics, and began with Jacob Frankfort's arrival about 1841.

19th century
In 1841 Jacob Frankfort arrived in the Mexican Pueblo de Los Ángeles in Alta California. He was the city's first known Jew. When California was admitted to the Union in 1850, The U.S. Census recorded that there were eight Jews living in Los Angeles.

Morris L. Goodman was the first Jewish Councilman in 1850 when the Pueblo de Los Ángeles Ayuntamento became the Los Angeles Common Council with U.S. statehood. Solomon Lazard, a Los Angeles merchant, served on the council in 1853, and also headed the first Los Angeles Chamber of Commerce. Arnold Jacobi was a council member in 1853–54.

Joseph Newmark, a lay rabbi, began conducting the first informal Sabbath services in Los Angeles in 1854.

In 1854, Joseph Newmark arrived in Los Angeles and helped found the Hebrew Benevolent Society for the evolving Jewish community, after organizing congregations in New York and St. Louis. The first organized Jewish community effort in Los Angeles was their acquiring a cemetery site from the city in 1855. The Hebrew Benevolent Society Cemetery was located at Lookout Drive and Lilac Terrace, in Chavez Ravine, central Los Angeles. Present day historical marker for the "First Jewish site in Los Angeles" is located south of Dodger Stadium, behind the police academy, in the Elysian Park area. In 1910 the bodies were moved to the Home of Peace Cemetery in East Los Angeles.

The oldest congregation in Los Angeles started in 1862, a Reform denomination, it is the present-day Wilshire Boulevard Temple congregation.

In 1865, Louis Lewin and Charles Jacoby organized the Pioneer Lot Association which developed an eastern Los Angeles area, later known as Boyle Heights.

In 1868, Isaias W. Hellman (1842–1920) and partners formed the Farmers and Merchants Bank in the city. In 1879, he was on the board of trustees to create the new University of Southern California. In 1881, Hellman was appointed a Regent of the University of California, was reappointed twice, and served until 1918.

20th century
From 1900 to 1926 there was no distinct Jewish neighborhood. 2500 Jews lived "downtown" which in 1910 was described as Temple Street (the main Jewish Street) and the area to its south. In 1920, this was described to include Central Avenue. Smaller groups lived in the University, Westlake, and wholesale areas. Except for University, these areas steadily declined between 1900 and 1926.

In 1900, two Jewish community historians stated that "there were far too few Jews to form a definitively Jewish district."

In 1900, there were 2,500 Jews. This increased to 5,795 Jews in 1910, 10,000 in 1917, 43,000 in 1923, and 65,000 in the mid-1920s.

In 1902, the Kaspare Cohn Hospital (1902–1910), which later became Cedars of Lebanon Hospital (Melrose/Vermont), and eventually Cedars-Sinai Medical Center, was established in Angelino Heights. From 1902 to 1905 it treated tuberculosis sufferers from Eastern sweatshops, until rich neighbors forced them to stop treating TB patients.

In 1906, the Sinai Temple was organized. It was the first Conservative congregation in Los Angeles and the first Conservative synagogue built west of Chicago. From completion in 1909 to 1925 the congregation worshiped at 12th and Valencia Streets. The congregation moved to Westwood in 1961. In 2013, the building was purchased by Craig Taubman who created the not-for-profit Pico Union Project, a multifaith and cultural Center. In 1911, the Hebrew Sheltering Association began, eventually becoming the Jewish Home for the Aged, now in Reseda.

In the 1920s, after an initial period in the Northeast and Midwest, significant numbers of Jewish immigrants and their families moved to Los Angeles, eventually making Boyle Heights home to the largest Jewish community west of Chicago. The Johnson-Reed Immigration Act of 1924 established annual quotas for immigrants from Europe and sharply limited migration of Southern and Eastern Europeans. However, the population of Jews in Los Angeles continued to increase rapidly as they moved West.

In 1927, I.M. Hattem, a Sephardic Jew, opened the first supermarket in America. The first Sephardic synagogue in Los Angeles was dedicated in 1932.

In 1935, a mass meeting was held at the Philharmonic Auditorium to protest against the treatment of the Jews in Germany. In 1936 the Los Angeles Jewish Community Council was incorporated, the present day Jewish Federation Council.
In 1940 Los Angeles had the seventh largest Jewish population of all the cities in the United States. Large numbers of Jews began to immigrate to Los Angeles after World War II. 2,000 Jews per month settled in Los Angeles in 1946. Almost 300,000 Jews lived in Los Angeles by 1950. Over 400,000 Jews lived in Los Angeles, about 18% of the total population, by the end of the 1950s. By the end of the 1970s, over 500,000 Jews lived in Los Angeles.

In 1989, there had been about 1,500 Soviet Jews who arrived in Los Angeles by December 4 of that year. Los Angeles area authorities anticipated that in the next two months an additional 850 Soviet Jews were to arrive.

Jews have played a role in creating or developing many Los Angeles business and cultural institutions, including the entertainment, fashion, and real estate industries.

21st century
Following the 2013 mayoral election, city councilman Eric Garcetti became the city's first elected Jewish mayor. He had previously served as the council president and was re-elected mayor in 2017.

Recent immigration
As of 1996, most immigrants from Israel to Los Angeles are Jews who are Hebrew-speakers.

History of the Jews in the entertainment industry

Jews played a major role in creating the film industry in Hollywood during the first half of the 20th century. Metro-Goldwyn-Mayer, 20th Century Fox, Columbia Pictures, Paramount Pictures, Universal Pictures, and Warner Bros. were all started and led by Jews, almost all of them recent immigrants or children of immigrants from Germany and Eastern Europe. In his book An Empire of Their Own, Neal Gabler wrote that in the movie industry, there "were none of the impediments imposed by loftier professions and more entrenched businesses to keep Jews and other undesirables out." Gabler also argued that because of discrimination in a predominately WASP America due to their Jewishness, "the Jews could simply create new a country--an empire of their own, so to speak . . . an America where fathers were strong, families stable, people attractive, resilient, resourceful, and decent." The 20th Century American Dream was to a considerable degree depicted and defined by Hollywood.

Very quickly, Protestants attacked the movie industry as a Jewish conspiracy to undermine "Christian" and "American" morals, especially in a period of large-scale immigration from southern and eastern Europe. Such beliefs in Jewish control, power, and conspiracy are traditional elements of anti-Semitic thinking. The role of these "Hollywood Jews" has been debated for years, but one thing is agreed on: most of them avoided identifying themselves as Jews at all, since their major desire was to assimilate and be accepted by the non-Jewish white establishment. Some African Americans, angered by negative images of blacks in movies and by the small number of major black directors and producers from the 1910s to 1960s, raised charges that Jews in Hollywood were both stereotyping and also unfairly excluding blacks. Hollywood leaders responded that there was no conspiracy controlling Hollywood and that Jews in the industry had been leading supporters of liberal causes, including civil rights and the expansion of black participation in the industry.

Geography
Since the late 1960s, Orthodox Jews have increasingly settled Hancock Park. Today, Hancock Park (as well as the adjoining Beverly-La-Brea District) is home to a rapidly expanding Hasidic Jewish population with the majority of the Chassidic Dynasties represented in strong number, in particular Satmar, Bobov, Boyan, Bobov-45, Belz, Ger, Karlin-Stolin, Vizhnitz, Munkacz, Spinka, Klausenburg, Skver, and Puppa communities, among others. Additionally, a community of Haredi non-Hasidic Lithuanian Jews (typically called Litvish or Yeshivish) reside in the area along with a with a smaller number of Modern Orthodox Jews.

As of 1990, the majority of Iranians in Beverly Hills were Jewish. By that year, many Iranian restaurants and businesses were established in a portion of Westwood Boulevard south of Wilshire Boulevard.

Jews have increasingly settled within the city of Los Angeles in the San Fernando Valley and in the Conejo Valley city of Thousand Oaks.

When Jews settled in Los Angeles, they were originally located in the Downtown area. Industrial expansion in the Downtown area pushed the Jews to Eastside Los Angeles, where The Los Angeles Jewish community formed in the years 1910–1920. The Brooklyn Avenue-Boyle Heights area, the Temple Street area, and the Central Avenue area were the settlement points of Jews in that period.

In the 1920s, the Jewish population saw Boyle Heights as the heart of the Jewish community. In 1908, Boyle Heights had three Jewish families. In 1920, there were 1,842 Jewish families there. In the mid-1920s, about 33% of all of the Jews in Los Angeles lived in Boyle Heights. By 1930, almost 10,000 Jewish families lived in Boyle Heights.

Since 1953, every representative of the City Council's 5th District has been Jewish.

By the 1980s, a large number of Jews moved to the Pico-Robertson neighborhood in Los Angeles' Westside. They joined an already established community of German Ashkenazi Jews who settled the area in the 1910s, and a newer population of Iranian Jews who had fled the revolution. Today, the neighborhood is home to a substantial Jewish community, with over six major Jewish private schools, and over thirty kosher restaurants (including Chinese, Mexican, Israeli, Thai, delis, steakhouses, and more), over twenty synagogues, and five mikvahs.

Other Jewish communities in Southern California of various denominations and nationalities are in Orange County, Riverside County (esp. the Coachella Valley with its resort city Palm Springs) and San Diego. 

As of 2020, about 87,000 Jews were estimated to reside in Orange County.

Demographics

According to a 2007 study by Pew Research, the Jewish population of Los Angeles has been said to be the most racially diverse in North America; with 8% being of mixed race and 7% being Hispanic or Latin. In 2007, Jewish students comprised 4% of the student body of the Los Angeles Unified School District. Los Angeles also had the highest percentage of adherents to Reconstructionist Judaism in the nation, who were estimated to number 7% of the local Jewish community.

Politics

Jewish voters usually vote in favor of politically liberal candidates or causes, but may vote differently in order to protect their interests/causes. By 2008 Jews made up about 33% of  voters in Los Angeles, while in 1993 they made up 25% of voters.  Jewish voters in the San Fernando Valley tend to be more politically conservative while those in the Los Angeles Westside tend to be more liberal; Jews in both areas largely support the Democratic Party. Jews vote in favor of immigrants. Raphael J. Sonenshein, in "The Role of the Jewish Community in Los Angeles Politics," wrote that the Jewish community had a significant impact in Los Angeles politics even though it is proportionally a small part of the city's population.

History
In the 1970s, the Westside Jews were in favor of desegregation busing in the Los Angeles Unified School District (LAUSD) while those in the San Fernando Valley opposed it. In previous eras, Jews and Black residents formed a political coalition although this coalition later declined after Tom Bradley stepped down from his position as Mayor of Los Angeles. That year the Jewish vote was split between mayoral candidates Richard Riordan and Mike Woo. Jews opposed Proposition 187, which passed in 1994. In 1997, 80% of Jews supported the LAUSD school bond, then the largest such bond in history; and 71% of Jews supported Riordan against Tom Hayden. Jews supported Antonio Villaraigosa as Mayor of Los Angeles in the 2001 primary; while he had a slim margin with Westside Jews in the 2001 runoff, the Jewish vote went to James Hahn. However Villaraigosa received most of the Jewish vote in the 2005 election.

Media

Film

In more recent times, the role of Jews in Hollywood has become less central, but individual Jews are still leaders in the industry.

Television

Los Angeles is home to one of only two Jewish television channels, Jewish Life Television which broadcasts worldwide from a studio in Sherman Oaks. In addition to this, JBS a Jewish television channel broadcasting from New York, features weekly Shabbat services from Sinai Temple in Westwood. Both channels are carried by local cable providers.

Print
The Jewish Journal of Greater Los Angeles is a local Jewish publication which is most noted for its interviews of Jewish celebrities and important figures in the Los Angeles Jewish community; as well as its features in local Jewish culture and events as well as news coverage of events affecting the community as well as other areas of the diaspora and in Israel. Despite it being a small publication many notable Jewish celebrities have been interviewed in the journal. Its cultural importance in the community has led to the publication and its reporters being depicted in such films as This Is 40, among others. The Jewish Journal is the largest Jewish publication outside of Israel, and is distributed across North America. In September 2020, The Jewish Journal announces the temporary suspension of the print version of the publication due to the economic effects ongoing COVID-19 pandemic, transitioning to being an online-only publication for the time being. A number of other Jewish magazines, newspapers, journals, and other publications exist in the greater Los Angeles area. These publications are printed in a number of languages spoken by the local Jewish community including but not limited to English, Yiddish, Hebrew, French, Farsi, Spanish, Ladino, and more. The Jewish Home Los Angeles publishes their own local weekly newspapers for their residents to peruse.

Radio

Southern California is home to one Jewish radio station. Kol Haneshama is a Jewish radio station, which broadcast 24 hours a day from the Ateret Israel synagogue in the Pico-Robertson neighborhood of Los Angeles. In addition to Kol Haneshama, some local stations rebroadcast Israeli Army Radio, catering to the large Israeli-American population of the city as well.

Cuisine

When Jews moved to Los Angeles, many of them established delicatessens. By 2013 several of the delis had closed due to the aging of their customer bases, newly established dining options, and issues in the economy.

The Jewish cuisine of Los Angeles resembled that of New York until the later 20th century, when more restaurants opened serving Persian Jewish and Israeli cuisine, among others. The influences of these cuisines, as well as Californian cuisine, the organic food movement, and the plentiful local produce have created a new unique Los Angeles Jewish cuisine. There are also a multitude of kosher restaurants through Los Angeles serving Jewish, Persian, Israeli, Moroccan, Yemenite, Chinese, Indian, Mexican and others.

Notable Jewish restaurants in Los Angeles include:

 Canter's Delicatessen
 Langer's Delicatessen
 Nate 'n Al of Beverly Hills
 Wexler's Deli
 Bavel
 The Milky Way, a kosher dairy restaurant in Beverly Grove founded by Leah Adler, and owned by Steven Spielberg
 Western Bagel
 Bibi's Bakery
 Harissa Restaurant and Bakery – Pico-Robertson
 Beverly Hills Kosher Thai
 Jeff's Gourmet Sausage Factory – Pico-Robertson

Education

Milken Community High School is located in Bel-Air.

In the Fairfax District, there are several Orthodox Jewish schools. Yeshiva Rav Isacsohn/Toras Emes Academy is a Haredi school with separate buildings for boys and girls grades K-8. Mesivta Los Angeles is a Hasidic Yeshiva that serves as preparation for Kollel. Yeshiva Gedolah of Los Angeles is an all-boys Litvish Haredi Yeshiva also primarily serves as preparation for higher-level Yeshiva study and Kollel. Bais Yaakov of Los Angeles is a Haredi girls-only high school that offers secular studies and college prep in addition to religious studies. Bnos Devorah High School is a very small Hasidic girls-only school. Yavneh Hebrew Academy is a Modern Orthodox K-8 school which is coed until 6th grade.

There are also several Orthodox Jewish schools in Pico-Robertson. Yeshiva University High Schools of Los Angeles is Modern Orthodox and has separate campuses for boys and girls. Mesivta Birkas Yitzchok is a Haredi boys-only high school that aims to offer both Talmud study and secular studies.

Jewish schools in the San Fernando Valley, as of 1988, included Valley Torah High School, Emek Hebrew Academy, Einstein Academy (grades 7-12) in Van Nuys, Abraham Joshua Heschel Day School (K-9) in Northridge, and Kadima Hebrew Academy (PreK-6) in Woodland Hills.

Rohr Jewish Learning Institute in partnership with Chabad is active throughout Los Angeles.

American Jewish University is located in Bel Air, Los Angeles.

Notable residents
 24kGoldn (rapper)
 J. J. Abrams (filmmaker and showrunner)
 Dianna Agron (actress)
 Jason Alexander (actor)
 Judd Apatow (filmmaker)
 Alan Arkin (actor)
 Irving Azoff (manager, executive)
 Sacha Baron Cohen (comedian, actor, filmmaker)
 Benny Blanco (rapper, music producer, actor, chef)
 Rachel Bloom (screenwriter, actress, showrunner)
 Amir Blumenfeld (comedian)
 Alison Brie (actress)
 Max Brooks (author, commentator)
 Mel Brooks (filmmaker, actor, comedian, author)
 Lizzy Caplan (actress)
 Mickey Cohen (gangster)
Emory Cohen (actor)
Flora Cross (film actress)
 Billy Crystal (comedian)
 Larry David (actor, comedian and television producer)
 Sammy Davis Jr. (actor, member of the Rat Pack)
 Jimmy Delshad (Mayor of Beverly Hills, California)
 Kat Dennings (actress)
 Kirk Douglas (actor)
 Michael Douglas (actor)
 Drake (rapper, actor, television producer)
Howard Deutch (filmmaker)
Zoey Deutch (actress)
 Bob Dylan (musician, poet)
 Zac Efron (actor)
 Jesse Eisenberg (actor, director, screenwriter, author)
 Doug Emhoff (entertainment lawyer and husband of Vice President Kamala Harris)
 Nora Ephron (writer, author, director and filmmaker)
 Susie Essman (comedian)
 Jon Favreau (writer, actor, filmmaker, chef, former speechwriter for President Obama)
 Beanie Feldstein (actress)
 Mike Feuer (City Attorney of Los Angeles)
 Isla Fisher (actress)
 Gal Gadot (actress and former Miss Israel)
 Ron Galperin (first-openly gay City Controller of Los Angeles)
 Jeff Garlin (actor, comedian, star of Curb Your Enthusiasm
 Jackie Goldberg (politician)
 Jake Gyllenhaal (actor)
 Maggie Gyllenhaal (actress)
 Marvin Hier (rabbi)
 Jonah Hill (actor)
 Rashida Jones (actress and television producer)
 Jenji Kohan (TV show producer)
 Zoe Kravitz (actress)
 Nick Kroll (actor, comedian, playwright)
 Norman Lear (showrunner)
 Dan Levy (actor and comedian)
 Eugene Levy (actor and comedian)
 Jane Levy (actor)
 Jerry Lewis (actor, comedian)
 Richard Lewis (actor, comedian)
 Lil Dicky (rapper, comedian, showrunner)
 Michael Milken (financier)
 Daniel Pearl (journalist) - Encino
 Judea Pearl (professor and father of Daniel Pearl)
 Natalie Portman (actress)
 Rob Reiner (actor and filmmaker)
 Shari Redstone (executive)
 Sumner Redstone (executive)
 Melissa Rivers (actress, producer, showrunner)
 Seth Rogen (comedian, filmmaker)
 Phil Rosenthal (producer, television presenter)
 Maya Rudolph (comedienne, actress, filmmaker, former SNL cast member)
 Adam Sandler (actor, comedian, musician and author)
 Adam Schiff (Democratic congressman)
 Iliza Shlesinger (comedian)
 Robert Shapiro (prominent lawyer and entrepreneur)
 Jeff Shell (executive)
 Shifty Shellshock (rapper)
 Brad Sherman (Democratic congressman)
 Pauly Shore (actor and comedian)
 Sarah Silverman (actor and comedian)
 Steven Spielberg (award-winning director, producer and filmmaker)
 Barbra Streisand (award-winning singer, songwriter, actress, director, author, and filmmaker)
 Rebecca Sugar (animator, creator of Steven Universe)
 Alan E. Willner
 Zvi Dershowitz (Rabbi - Sinai Temple)
 Eric Garcetti (Mayor of Los Angeles)
 Henry Waxman (former Democratic congressman)
 Zev Yaroslavsky (politician)

See also

 To the Golden Cities - A book which discusses the formation of the Los Angeles Jewish community

References
 Gurock, Jeffrey S. American Jewish History: The Colonial and Early National Periods, 1654–1840, Volume 1. Taylor & Francis, 1998. , 9780415919258.
 Sonenshein, Raphael J. "The Role of the Jewish Community in Los Angeles Politics: From Bradley to Villaraigosa." Southern California Quarterly, Vol. 90, No. 2 (Summer 2008), pp. 189–205. Available at JSTOR.
 Originally a paper presented on November 13, 2005 at the conference "Jewish L.A. - Then and Now" at the Center for Jewish Studies in the Autry Museum; it was revised for publication as a journal article.

Reference notes

Further reading
 Chammou, Eliezer. Migration and adjustment: the case of Sephardic Jews in Los Angeles. University of California, Los Angeles, 1976. Available in Snippet View from Google Books.
 Gelfand, Mitchell Brian. Chutzpah in El Dorado: Social Mobility of Jews in Los Angeles, 1900–1920. Carnegie-Mellon University, 1981. Available in Snippet View from Google Books.
Newmark, Harris. Sixty Years in Southern California 1853–1913. NY:1926.
 Soomekh, Sabah. From the Shahs to Los Angeles: Three Generations of Iranian Jewish Women between Religion and Culture. SUNY Press, November 1, 2012. , 9781438443836.
Vorspan, Max and Gartner, Lloyd. History of the Jews of Los Angeles. Huntington Library. 1970.
 Wilson, Karen. Jews in the Los Angeles Mosaic. University of California Press, May 1, 2013. , 9780520275508.
 The Jews of Los Angeles: Urban pioneers. Southern California Jewish Historical Society, 1981. Available in Snippet View from Google Books.
 Phillips, Bruce. "Jewish population of L.A., Valley districts" (Opinion). The Jewish Journal of Greater Los Angeles. February 22, 2012.

External links

 Timeline of Jewish History in Los Angeles
 The Jewish Federation of Greater Los Angeles
 Jewish Home Los Angeles Magazine
 Iranian American Jewish Federation
 Center for Jewish Studies (CJS), University of California, Los Angeles
 Mapping Jewish LA, a project of the CJS
 Jewish Journal

Demographics of Los Angeles
Los Angeles
 
Los Angeles
Jewish